This is a list of newspapers in Ghana. In 2007, there were 136 newspapers. Not all papers currently have a website.

List of newspapers

See also
Media of Ghana
 List of radio stations in Ghana
Telecommunications in Ghana
New media in Ghana

References

Further reading

External links
Ghana Newspapers, World Press
Ghana News (independent)
 

Newspapers

Ghana